Yuriy Mykhaylovych Pankiv (born 3 November 1984) is a professional Ukrainian football goalkeeper.

Career

Clubs career
Born in Lviv, Pankiv is the product of FC Karpaty Lviv sportive school in his native city, but not made debut for the main team. During some years he played for different Ukrainian clubs, but never in the Ukrainian Premier League. In 2009, he signed a contract with PFC Oleksandria in the Ukrainian First League, and in 2011 made debut in Premier League together with his team against FC Vorskla Poltava on 8 July.

On 9 August 2012, Pankiv made his UEFA Europa League debut as a member of FC Arsenal Kyiv, at Ljudski vrt in Maribor, against Slovenian side Mura 05. He kept a clean sheet as Arsenal won 2–0.

In November 2018, Molod Ukrayiny named Pankiv as Ukrainian Goalkeeper of the Year in their annual football awards edition.

National representation
On 27 May 2019, at the age of 34, Pankiv was called up to the Ukraine national team for the first time in his career, due to Denys Boyko's injury.

References

External links

1984 births
Living people
Sportspeople from Lviv
Ukrainian footballers
FC Karpaty Lviv players
FC Karpaty-2 Lviv players
FC Karpaty-3 Lviv players
FC Enerhetyk Burshtyn players
FC Hazovyk-Skala Stryi players
FC Lviv players
FC Nyva Ternopil players
FC Desna Chernihiv players
FC Oleksandriya players
FC Arsenal Kyiv players
FC Metalurh Donetsk players
Ukrainian Premier League players
Ukrainian First League players
Ukrainian Second League players
Association football goalkeepers
FC Stal Kamianske players
FC Rukh Lviv players
Ukraine youth international footballers